Featherstone Park was a railway station on the Alston Branch Line, which ran between Haltwhistle and Alston.

The station was opened by the Newcastle and Carlisle Railway on 19 July 1851. Originally known as Featherstone, it was later renamed Featherstone Park on 23 June 1902 by the North Eastern Railway.

Between Haltwhistle and Featherstone Park, there were two unadvertised calling points, at Park Village and Plenmeller Halt. A platform was extant at Plenmeller Halt from the early 1920s until the late 1940s, however trains regularly stopped to allow passengers to board and alight long after the halt's official closure. No such facilities existed at Park Village.

History
The Newcastle and Carlisle Railway was formed in 1829, opening to passengers in stages from March 1835. A branch line from Haltwhistle to Alston and Nenthead was first considered in 1841, with the line authorised by an Act of Parliament in August 1846. It was later decided that a line operating as far as Alston was sufficient, with the amended route approved by a further Act in July 1849.

In March 1851, the 4-mile section from Haltwhistle to Shaft Hill (which was later renamed Coanwood) was opened to goods traffic, with passenger services commencing in July 1851. The 8-mile section of the line between Alston and Lambley opened to goods traffic in January 1852, along with a short branch to Lambley Fell, with passenger services commencing in May 1852.

Construction of the branch line was completed in November 1852, following the opening of the, now Grade II* listed, Lambley Viaduct over the River South Tyne.

Demise and closure
Featherstone Park, along with Slaggyford, was reduced to unstaffed halt status in 1954. The neighbouring station at Coanwood followed closely after, becoming an unstaffed halt in 1955.

The line was originally marked for closure in the 1960s, under the Beeching plan, however the lack of an all-weather road kept it open. Following improvements to the road network, including a temporary level crossing over the branch at Lambley, the line was closed on 3 May 1976 by the British Railways Board, with the last train working two days earlier. The line was replaced in part by a bus service, which was operated by Ribble Motor Services.

Since the line's closure, a  section of the line has since reopened in stages between Slaggyford and Alston, with heritage services operated by the South Tynedale Railway.

References

Sources

External links
 

Disused railway stations in Northumberland
Former North Eastern Railway (UK) stations
Railway stations in Great Britain closed in 1976
Railway stations in Great Britain opened in 1851
1852 establishments in England
Beeching closures in England